"River Deep – Mountain High" is a song by Ike & Tina Turner released as the title track to their 1966 studio album on Philles Records. Produced by Phil Spector and written by Spector, Jeff Barry and Ellie Greenwich. Rolling Stone ranked "River Deep – Mountain High" No. 33 on their list of the 500 Greatest Songs of All Time. NME ranked it No. 37 on their list of the 500 Greatest Songs of All Time. The Rock and Roll Hall of Fame added it to the list of the 500 Songs That Shaped Rock and Roll. The song was inducted into the Grammy Hall of Fame in 1999.

The single did not perform well upon its original release in the US, but it was successful in Europe. Spector claimed to be pleased with the response from the critics and his peers, but he then withdrew from the music industry for two years, beginning his personal decline. After a revival of the song from covers by Eric Burdon and the Animals and Deep Purple in 1968, the original version was reissued by A&M Records in 1969.

Background 
Phil Spector had seen the Ike & Tina Turner Revue perform at a club on the Sunset Strip and invited them to appear on The Big T.N.T. Show. Spector was impressed by Tina Turner and wanted to use her voice with the Wrecking Crew, and his "Wall of Sound" production technique. He went to the Turners' house, and struck a deal with Ike Turner to produce Tina. Ike agreed, but wanted the recordings to be credited to Ike & Tina Turner. At the time they were signed to Loma Records (a subsidiary of Warner Bros.). Spector negotiated a deal with Ike & Tina Turner's manager Bob Krasnow, who was also head of Loma. He offered $20,000 ($ in ) to have them released from their contract. After Mike Maitland (then president at Warner Bros.) gave them their release, they signed with Spector's Philles Records.

Recording 
"River Deep – Mountain High" was the first recording that Tina Turner did for Philles at Gold Star Studios. It was written by Phil Spector, Jeff Barry and Ellie Greenwich. The track cost a then unheard-of $22,000 ($ in ), and required 21 session musicians.

After several rehearsals, and two sessions for the musicians to lay down a backing track, Spector got Tina Turner into the studio on March 7, but she was unable to provide what he wanted. The following week she returned to the studio with Ike Turner. Due to Spector's perfectionism and tendency to abuse workers in the studio, he made her sing the song over and over for several hours until he felt he had the perfect vocal take for the song. She recalled, "I must have sung that 500,000 times. I was drenched with sweat. I had to take my shirt off and stand there in my bra to sing."

It was reported that the Beach Boys' Brian Wilson attended the session, where he sat "transfixed" and "did not say a word".

When Spector inducted Ike & Tina Turner into the Rock and Roll Hall of Fame in 1991, he revealed in his speech that he had invited Ike Turner to play guitar in the session for "River Deep – Mountain High," but Turner didn't show up. 

The recording of the song was later dramatized for Tina Turner's 1993 biographical film, What's Love Got to Do with It.

Personnel
Lead vocals: Tina Turner
Background vocals: Darlene Love, Fanita James, Jean King, Gracia Nitzsche, Clydie King
Composer lyricists: Phil Spector, Jeff Barry, and Ellie Greenwich
Producer: Phil Spector
Arranger: Jack Nitzsche
Musicians: Leon Russell (keyboards), Michel Rubini (piano), Jim Horn (saxophone), Barney Kessel (guitar), Glen Campbell (guitar), Earl Palmer (drums), Carol Kaye (bass guitar), Frank Capp (percussion)

Release and reception

Reviewing the single, Billboard wrote: "Exciting dance beat production backs a wailin' Tina vocal on a solid rock tune penned by Barry and Greenwich." It entered the lower end of the Billboard Hot 100 and stopped at No. 88 on the pop chart. The disappointing chart performance resulted in the album being shelved in the US. Spector was so disillusioned that he ceased involvement in the recording industry totally for two years, and only intermittently returned to the studio after that. He effectively became a recluse and began to self-destruct.

Ike Turner remarked that "if Phil had released the record and put anybody else's name on it, it would have been a huge hit. But because Tina Turner's name was on it, the white stations classified it an R&B record and wouldn't play it. The white stations say it was too black, and the black stations say it was too white, so that record didn't have a home."

Writer Michael Billig speculated that although earlier records which had mixed black singers with a white pop sound had sold well, by 1966 the black political movement was encouraging African Americans to take a pride in their own culture, and "River Deep – Mountain High" was out of step with that movement.

The single, released on London Records in Europe, was a hit overseas. It peaked at No. 3 in the UK, No. 9 in the Netherlands, and it reached No. 1 in Spain.

George Harrison praised the record, declaring it "a perfect record from start to finish. You couldn't improve on it."

Reissues 
After "River Deep – Mountain High" was revived by other bands, Ike & Tina Turner's original version was reissued by A&M Records in 1969. It has since gained the recognition Spector wanted for the record. Reviewing the single, Record World called it a "classic, perhaps the greatest single of all time."

Ike & Tina Turner recorded different renditions of the song without Spector's "Wall of Sound" production style. A version on the 1973 album Nutbush City Limits was released as a single titled "River Deep, Mountain High 1974" on United Artists Records in France. Another version from an undetermined year was released on the 1991 compilation Proud Mary: The Best of Ike & Tina Turner.

Tina Turner recorded a few solo versions, in 1986, 1991 and 1993. Tina included live performances on her albums, Tina Live in Europe and Tina Live.

Chart performance

Certifications

The Supremes and the Four Tops version 

In 1970, their post-Diana Ross era, The Supremes and the Four Tops released a version. Produced by Nickolas Ashford and Valerie Simpson, the single was one of several recordings that paired the two Motown groups.  The Supremes and Four Tops cover, included on the 1970 LP The Magnificent 7, with its soaring vocals and string section, peaked at No. 7 on the soul chart and No. 14 on the Billboard Hot 100 in 1971, making it the highest-charting version of the song in the United States. Their version also peaked No. 11 on the UK Singles Chart, No. 23 in Belgium, and No. 25 on Netherlands' MegaCharts.

Charts

Weekly charts

Year-end charts

Other notable covers 
A ten-minute version was recorded by Deep Purple for their 1968 album, The Book of Taliesyn. An edited version was released as a single in the United States and reached number 53 in early 1969 and number 42 on the Canadian RPM charts. It had a progressive rock sound to it, as Deep Purple had not yet adopted the hard rock sound for which they are most famous.

Celine Dion covered the song on her 1996 album Falling Into You.  At first, Phil Spector showed interest in producing the album track, but left the project so Jim Steinman took over as producer. Spector was unimpressed by Steinman's efforts, calling Steinman a "bad clone" of himself.  Dion had previously performed the song in some of her concerts, as included in her live album Live à Paris, recorded in 1995.

Amber Riley and Naya Rivera covered the song on episode four ("Duets") of the second season of Fox television show Glee. Their version peaked at number 41 on the Billboard Hot 100.

Christina Aguilera performed the song at the 2021 Rock and Roll Hall of Fame Induction Ceremony.

References

External links
List of cover versions of song
BBC.co.uk: Sold on Song - "River Deep - Mountain High"
Ralph MacLean

1966 songs
1966 singles
1968 singles
1969 singles
1970 singles
1971 singles
Ike & Tina Turner songs
Songs written by Ellie Greenwich
Songs written by Jeff Barry
Songs written by Phil Spector
Song recordings with Wall of Sound arrangements
Song recordings produced by Phil Spector
The Supremes songs
Four Tops songs
Tina Turner songs
The Animals songs
Deep Purple songs
Song recordings produced by Tom Wilson (record producer)
MGM Records singles
Motown singles
Philles Records singles
A&M Records singles
London Records singles
Grammy Hall of Fame Award recipients
Number-one singles in Spain
Songs about rivers
Songs about mountains